The 2002 Oklahoma Sooners football team represented the University of Oklahoma during the 2002 NCAA Division I-A football season, the 108th season of Sooner football. The team was led by Bob Stoops in his fourth season as head coach. They played their games at Gaylord Family Oklahoma Memorial Stadium in Norman, Oklahoma. They were a charter of the Big 12 Conference.

Conference play began with a win over the Missouri Tigers in Columbia, Missouri on October 5, and ended with their second win over the Colorado Buffaloes that season in the 2002 Big 12 Championship Game on December 7. The Sooners finished the regular season 11–2 (7–2 in Big 12), winning their second Big 12 title and their 38th conference title overall. They received an automatic berth to play in their first Rose Bowl in school history, where they beat the Washington State Cougars, 34–14.

Following the season, Andre Woolfolk was selected 28th overall in the 2003 NFL Draft, along with Quentin Griffin in the 4th round, Jimmy Wilkerson in the 6th, and Trent Smith in the 7th.

Schedule

Roster

Game summaries

Tulsa

Alabama

UTEP

South Florida

Missouri

Texas (Red River Shootout)

Iowa State

Colorado

Texas A&M

Baylor

Texas Tech

Oklahoma State (Bedlam Series)

Colorado (Big 12 Championship Game)

Washington State (Rose Bowl)

Rankings

2003 NFL Draft

The 2003 NFL Draft was held on April 26–27, 2003 at the Theatre at Madison Square Garden in New York City. The following Oklahoma players were either selected or signed as undrafted free agents following the draft.

References

Oklahoma
Big 12 Conference football champion seasons
Rose Bowl champion seasons
Oklahoma Sooners football seasons
Oklahoma Sooners football